The 1996 Cincinnati Bearcats football team represented University of Cincinnati during 1996 NCAA Division I-A football season.

Schedule

Roster

References

Cincinnati
Cincinnati Bearcats football seasons
Cincinnati Bearcats football